Melissa Hoffer is a lawyer specializing in environmental law.

Early life and education
Hoffer holds a B.A. from Hampshire College and graduated from Northeastern University's School of Law in 1998.

Law career
Hoffer was with the law firm Wilmer Cutler Pickering Hale and Dorr in Boston from 1999 to 2007, where she was promoted to junior partner in 2003.

Since July 2004, she and a team from her firm worked with the Center for Constitutional Rights to represent the Algerian Six at Guantanamo Bay detention center in a habeas corpus suit against the United States government. They were six Bosnian men who were native-born Algerians, and who had been kidnapped by US officials after a Bosnian court  released them. They had been detained since January 2002 at Guantanamo Bay detainment camp without the US charging them with any crime.

As the federal case was pending, in 2007 Hoffer traveled with a team to Guantanamo to interview the men and offer further services.

On January 7, 2007, the Boston Globe published an article by Hoffer about her Guantanamo clients. Hoffer represents the "Algerian Six".

In a 2007 profile for Northeastern Law magazine, Hoffer compared her clients' cases with the landmark civil rights cases of Brown v. Board of Education, key to African Americans getting equal access to education opportunities, and Korematsu v. United States, a key case fought for the rights of Americans of Japanese descent, interned during World War 2.

Hoffer said:

In October 2008, in Boumediene v. Bush, the US Supreme Court ruled that habeas and other protections of the US Constitution applied to detainees at Guantanamo, and other foreign nationals. The judge ruled that five of the Algerian Six were being held illegally and ordered their release.

Three have returned to their families in Bosnia, but the other two men are essentially stateless. Bosnia does not want them and they fear for their safety if they return to Algeria. The sixth is still in custody, although a federal appeals panel has ordered his release. The Obama administration has not responded to the court.

References

Guantanamo Bay attorneys
Living people
Hampshire College alumni
Northeastern University School of Law alumni
Wilmer Cutler Pickering Hale and Dorr partners
Year of birth missing (living people)
21st-century American women lawyers
21st-century American lawyers